Youngs Memorial Cemetery is a small cemetery in the village of Oyster Bay Cove, New York in the United States of America. It is located approximately one and a half miles south of Sagamore Hill National Historic Site. The cemetery was chartered in 1900 and was located on land owned by the Youngs family.

Background

Theodore Roosevelt, the twenty-sixth President of the United States, and his wife Edith Roosevelt are buried at Youngs.

See also
 Oyster Bay History Walk
 Theodore Roosevelt in Oyster Bay
 List of Town of Oyster Bay Landmarks
 National Register of Historic Places listings in Nassau County, New York

References

Further reading
  Youngs Memorial Cemetery

Oyster Bay (town), New York
Cemeteries in Nassau County, New York
1900 establishments in New York (state)
Tombs of presidents of the United States